Choa may refer to:

CHOA-FM, a Canadian radio station
CKSQ-FM, a Canadian radio station formerly CHOA
Choa (singer) (Park Cho-a, born 1990), South Korean singer and actress
Choa, a postos of Mozambique
Children's Healthcare of Atlanta
Choa Mountains, in Manica Province of Mozambique

See also

Chao (disambiguation)